"Walk Away" is a song written by Tord Bäckström, Bengt Girell and Jan Nilsson for German pop-rock group Aloha from Hell's 2009 debut album No More Days to Waste. It was released as the album's second single on November 14, 2008. The song reached number twenty-six in the German singles chart.

Track listings
CD Single
"Walk Away (single version)" - 3:47
"Walk Away (orchestral version)" - 4:15

CD Maxi Single
"Walk Away (single version)" - 3:47
"Walk Away (orchestral version)" - 4:15
"Wake Me Up" - 3:23
"Walk Away (instrumental)" - 3:44
"Walk Away (music video)" - 3:48

Charts

References

External links
Aloha From Hell's official website

Songs about parting
Aloha from Hell songs
2008 songs
Rock ballads